Matheus Borges (born 20 July 1993) is a Brazilian field hockey player. He competed in the men's field hockey tournament at the 2016 Summer Olympics.

References

1993 births
Living people
Brazilian male field hockey players
Olympic field hockey players of Brazil
Field hockey players at the 2016 Summer Olympics
Place of birth missing (living people)
South American Games bronze medalists for Brazil
South American Games medalists in field hockey
Competitors at the 2014 South American Games
21st-century Brazilian people